Marc Steiner is an American radio talk show and podcast host.

He currently hosts The Marc Steiner Show. He previously worked for WYPR (and its predecessor, WJHU) from 1993 until parting with the organization on February 1, 2008, and on WEAA 88.9FM, an NPR affiliate station, in Baltimore, Maryland, from 2008 to 2017. In 2018 he started The Marc Steiner Show on The Real News Network where he also works as a host and an author.

He also operates his own production company, the Center for Emerging Media. CEM produced the Peabody award-winning series Just Words, which featured the voices and stories of working people in Baltimore often relegated to statistics.

Personal life 
Steiner lives with his wife, Valerie, and resides in Sparks, Maryland.
He has three daughters, four grandchildren, and two great-grandchildren.

References

External links
 Website of radio show
 "Are Nader-Like Reforms Still Possible? – Ralph Nader on Reality Asserts Itself", The Real News Network
 Marc Steiner on The Real News Network

American talk radio hosts
Radio personalities from Baltimore
Living people
Year of birth missing (living people)